Arimachi (written: 有待 or 有町) is a Japanese surname. Notable people with the surname include:

, Japanese footballer

See also
 Aimachi

Japanese-language surnames